

Roster

Schedule and Results

Standings

References 

North Carolina
North Carolina Tar Heels women's basketball seasons
NCAA Division I women's basketball tournament Final Four seasons
North Car
North Car